KFA can refer to:

Association football
 Kelantan FA, football club in Malaysia 
 Korea Football Association, governs football in South Korea 
 Kuwait Football Association, governs football in Kuwait 
 Kerala Football Association, governs lower-tier football in Kerala, India 
 Kwara Football Academy, Nigeria, develops people's football skills 

Other meanings
 Kentucky Fairness Alliance, gay rights organization 
 King Fahad Academy, Islamic school in London 
 Korean Friendship Association, promotes friendship with North Korea 
 IATA code for Kiffa Airport, Mauritania 
 Kodava language of Karnataka, India (ISO code: kfa) 
 Kleinpell Fine Arts, building at the University of Wisconsin–River Falls, United States